Tiit Härm (born 19 March 1946) is an Estonian ballet dancer, ballet master and choreographer.

Tiit Härm was born in Tallinn. He is the younger brother of actress and author Viiu Härm. From 1957 to 1962, he studied at Tallinn Choreographic School. In 1966 he graduated from Leningrad Choreographic School. From 1966 to 1967 he was a dancer at Estonia Theatre. From 1967 to 1972 he was a soloist at All-Union Choreographic Collective Noor Ballett. Since 1972 he worked again at Estonia Theatre. From 2001 to 2009 he was the ballet manager, principal ballet master and choreographer of Estonia Theatre.

In 2014 he established his own ballet theatre.

He has also appeared as an actor in several films.

Awards
 2001: Order of the White Star, IV class.

Filmography
 Tantsib Tiit Härm (1975, Tallinnfilm documentary)
 Hukkunud Alpinisti hotell (1979, Tallinnfilm)
 Anna Pavlova: A Woman for All Time  (1983, Soviet Union and Great Britain television miniseries)
 Sädelev maailm (1984, Mosfilm)

References

Living people
1946 births
Estonian male ballet dancers
Estonian choreographers
Ballet masters
Estonian male film actors
Estonian male television actors
20th-century Estonian male actors
Recipients of the Order of the White Star, 4th Class
People from Tallinn